Water polo was contested for men only at the 1963 Pan American Games in São Paulo, Brazil.

Competing teams
Five teams contested the event.

Medalists

References

1963
1963 Pan American Games
1963
1963 in water polo